Truby is a surname. Notable people with the surname include:

Chris Truby (born 1973), third baseman who played some of his career in Major League Baseball
Harry Truby (1870–1953), former professional baseball player who was an infielder in the Major Leagues from 1895 to 1896
Jason Truby (born 1973), American musician
John Truby (born 1952), screenwriter, director and screenwriting teacher

See also
Truby King CMG (1858–1938), generally known as Truby King, was a New Zealand health reformer and Director of Child Welfare